Dirk Sanders (born 30 September 1955) is a former Belgian footballer who played as midfielder.

Honours

Player 

 Club Brugge

 Belgian First Division: 1975–76, 1976–77, 1977–78
 Belgian Cup: 1976–77
 UEFA Cup: 1975-76 (runner-up)
 European Cup: 1977-78 (runner-up)
 Jules Pappaert Cup: 1978

References 

Belgian footballers
1955 births
Living people
Club Brugge KV players
Association football midfielders